Mosab Hassan Yousef (nicknamed "The Green Prince"; born 5 May 1978) is a Palestinian who worked undercover for Israel's internal security service Shin Bet from 1997 to 2007.

Shin Bet considered him its most valuable source within the Hamas leadership. The information Yousef supplied prevented dozens of suicide attacks and assassinations of Israelis, exposed numerous Hamas cells, and assisted Israel in hunting down many militants, and incarcerating his own father, Hamas leader Sheikh Hassan Yousef. In March 2010, he published his autobiography titled Son of Hamas.

In 1999, Yousef converted to Christianity, and in 2007 he moved to the United States. His request for political asylum in the United States was granted pending a routine background check in 2010.

Biography
His father, Sheikh Hassan Yousef, was a Hamas leader who spent many years in Israeli prisons. He is the oldest of five brothers and three sisters.

When Yousef was growing up, he wanted to be a fighter because that was according to him what was expected of Palestinian children in the West Bank. Yousef was first arrested when he was ten, during the First Intifada, for throwing rocks at Israeli settlers. He was further arrested and jailed by Israel numerous times. As his father's eldest son, he was seen as his heir apparent, and became an important part of the Hamas organization. 

Yousef said he saw the light after a stint with his dad’s comrades in an Israeli jail during the mid-1990s. At Megiddo Prison, he witnessed Hamas inmates leading a brutal year-long campaign to weed out supposed Israeli collaborators. "During that time, Hamas tortured and killed hundreds of prisoners,” he said, recalling vivid memories of needles being inserted under finger nails and bodies charred with burning plastics. Many, if not all, had nothing to do with Israeli intelligence. “I will never forget their screams,” he continued. “I started asking myself a question. What if Hamas succeeded in destroying Israel and building a state. Will they destroy our people in this way?” 

Yousef's doubts about Islam and Hamas began forming when he realized Hamas' brutality, and that he hated how Hamas used the lives of suffering civilians and children to achieve its goals. Yousef was held by Shin Bet agents in 1996. While in prison, he was shocked by Shin Bet's interrogation methods, which he considered humane, when compared to how Hamas operatives tortured imprisoned suspected collaborators. He decided to accept a Shin Bet offer to become an informant.

Espionage career
Beginning with his release from prison in 1997, Yousef was considered the Shin Bet's most reliable source in the Hamas leadership, earning himself the nickname "The Green Prince" – using the color of the Islamist group's flag, and "prince" because of his pedigree as the son of one of the movement's founders. The intelligence he supplied to Israel led to the exposure of many Hamas cells, as well as the prevention of dozens of suicide bombings and assassination attempts on Jews. He has claimed that he did not inform for money, but rather that his motivations were ideological and religious, and that he only wanted to save lives. In order to thwart any suspicions of collaboration, the Shin Bet staged an arrest attempt, telling the Israel Defense Forces to launch an operation to arrest him, and then provided him intelligence allowing him to escape at the last minute, after which he went into hiding for the rest of his career.

Yousef says he supplied intelligence only on the condition that the "targets" would not be killed, but arrested. This led to the detention of several key Palestinian leaders, including Ibrahim Hamid, a Hamas commander in the West Bank, and Marwan Barghouti. Also, Yousef claims to have thwarted a 2001 plot to assassinate Shimon Peres, then foreign minister and later President of Israel. According to his former Shin Bet officer, "Many people owe him their lives and don't even know it."

Conversion to Christianity
According to his story, Yousef met a British missionary in 1999 who introduced him to Christianity. Between the years 1999 and 2000, Yousef gradually embraced Christianity. In 2005, he was secretly baptized in Tel Aviv by an unidentified Christian tourist. He left the West Bank for the United States in 2007, and lived some time in San Diego, California, where he joined the Barabbas Road Church.

In August 2008, Yousef publicly revealed his Christianity, and renounced Hamas and the Arab leadership, thereby endangering himself and exposing his family in Ramallah to persecution. Yousef has also claimed that his aim was to bring peace to the Middle East; he hopes to return to his homeland when there is peace.

Yousef has stated that despite his conversion to Christianity, he is "against religion", and does not adhere to any denomination of Christianity. He has stated, "Religion steals freedom, kills creativity, turns us into slaves and against one another. Yes, I am talking about Christianity as well as Islam. Most Christians I have seen, seem to have missed the point, that Jesus redeemed us from religion. Religion is nothing but man's attempts to get back to God. Whether it is Islam, Christianity, Judaism, Buddhism, Hinduism, animism, any ism. Religion can't save mankind. Only Jesus could save mankind through his death and resurrection. And Jesus is the only way to God."

Autobiography
Yousef's co-authored autobiography, Son of Hamas: A Gripping Account of Terror, Betrayal, Political Intrigue, and Unthinkable Choices, written with the assistance of Ron Brackin, was published in March 2010.

Yousef's brother Ouwais denounced the report about his brother's activities, saying: "It was full of lies; it's all lies." Ouwais also revealed that the last contact between his family and Mosab took place more than a year before the news of his spying. Sheikh Hassan Yousef, Mosab's father, while in an Israeli prison, disowned his son for spying for Israel. The Haaretz report on Yousef was described by Hamas MP Mushir al-Masri as "psychological war being waged against the Palestinian people... [it] did not deserve a response".

Deportation threats and political asylum
For a time, Yousef was threatened with deportation from the U.S., after his request for political asylum was denied, since statements in his book about working for Hamas were interpreted as "providing material support to a U.S.-designated terrorist organization", despite Yousef's explanation that they were "intended to undermine the group". His case then proceeded to the deportation stage, despite Yousef's advocates' warning that he would likely be executed by the Palestinian Authority if deported to the West Bank.

On 24 June 2010, Shin Bet handler Gonen Ben Itzhak, who for 10 years worked with Yousef under the cryptonym "Loai", revealed his own identity in order to testify on behalf of Yousef at an immigration hearing in San Diego. Ben-Yitzhak described Yousef as a "true friend", and said, "he risked his life every day in order to prevent violence".

Partially as a result of this, Immigration Court Judge Richard J. Bartolomei, Jr., ruled on 30 June 2010, that Yousef would be allowed to remain in the United States after being fingerprinted and passing a routine background check.

He is a frequent guest speaker on various American news channels, where he talks about the atrocities committed by Hamas.

Films
A documentary adaptation of Son of Hamas titled The Green Prince, directed and written by Nadav Schirman, premiered at the 2014 Sundance Film Festival, where it won the Audience Award for World Cinema: Documentary. The Green Prince will be re-made into a live-action feature film.

Yousef is collaborating with US-based actor and film producer Sam Feuer in the production of two films: a feature film adaptation of Yousef's book Son of Hamas and documentary The Green Prince, and a historical depiction of the life of the Muslim prophet Muhammad based on the accounts of eighth-century historian Ibn Ishaq.

Views and controversies
Some elements of Yousef's story have been questioned. Former Shin Bet Deputy Chief Gideon Ezra described Yousef's claims as "too good to be true", and stated that, "there are hundreds of collaborators like him. He is not unusual. He just decided to write a book about it." The conversion to Christianity narrative promoted by Yousef and his book publishers remains unsubstantiated as well. Critics have alleged that Yousef claimed he was a Christian (for a longer period of time) in order to help secure asylum in the United States. This tactic is common for Muslim immigrants seeking to avoid deportation to countries where apostasy laws exist. However, he has since become an active figure in evangelical non-denominational Christianity in America, and has appeared on programs such as The 700 Club. Interest in the book from Christian readers helped make it a New York Times best-seller. During an appearance on The 700 Club to promote his book "Son of Hamas", he was welcomed and interviewed by host Pat Robertson.

At an "End Times Prophecy" conference in 2010, hosted by California-based evangelist Greg Laurie, Yousef told the crowd in attendance that Islam is "the biggest lie in human history." He further suggested at the conference that the Quran should not be legal in the United States ("banned on American soil").

In May 2016, talking to a Jerusalem Post conference in New York, Yousef claimed that at one time he was working for, and being paid by, Israel, the United States, the Palestinian Authority, and Hamas, all at the same time. He went on to say that Islam as a whole is comparable to Nazism, and must be defeated.

Published works

References

External links

Archived copy of defunct official website of the book (February 1, 2014)
al-Qaida's reaction to Mosab's Apostasy (August 2008)
Magazine article from Haaretz (Feb. 2010)
Interview on CBN with Pat Robertson
Interview with BBC's Lyse Doucet and other reactions from Israel/Palestine
Mosab very outspoken on BBC Arabic (12 March 2010): arabic 30min; engl. subtitle 5min
more details : transcript of a teleconference  with Christian journalists (18 March)
Mosab wants to create a 'movement' in the Middle East 
23min HARDtalk on BBC (14 May 2010)
Long Interview in Haaretz with Captain Loai, Mosab's Shin Bet-Handler (14 May 2010); Similar to Newsweek  (17 May 2010)
 

1978 births
Living people
Arab supporters of Israel
Autobiographers
Christian Zionists
Converts to Protestantism from Islam
Former Muslim critics of Islam
Hamas
Israeli spies
Palestinian Christians
Palestinian emigrants to the United States
Palestinian former Muslims
Palestinian memoirists
Palestinian people imprisoned by Israel
People from Ramallah
People of the Shin Bet